On Record is the second studio album by Canadian rock band April Wine, released in April 1972. The album spawned the hit "You Could Have Been a Lady" a cover of the Hot Chocolate song that was only released one year earlier. The song peaked at No. 32 on May 19, 1972 on the Billboard Hot 100. It has since then been one of the band most popular songs.

Track listing
All tracks written by Myles Goodwyn unless otherwise noted.
 "Farkus" (instrumental) – 1:53
 "You Could Have Been a Lady" (Errol Brown, Tony Wilson) – 3:40
 "Believe in Me" – 4:02
 "Work All Day" – 3:08
 "Drop Your Guns" (D. Henman) – 3:37
 "Bad Side of the Moon" (Elton John, Bernie Taupin) – 3:36
 "Refuge" (D. Henman) – 5:08
 "Flow River Flow" – 3:25
 "Carry On" – 2:33
 "Didn't You" (J. Clench) – 4:58

Personnel

April Wine 
Myles Goodwyn – vocals, guitar
 David Henman – guitar, backing vocals
 Ritchie Henman – drums
 Jim Clench – bass, lead vocals on "Didn't You"
Guest musicians
 Keith Jollimore – flute.
 Rick Morrison – Alto Saxophone 
Production
 Ralph Murphy – producer
 Terry Brown – recording engineer

References

April Wine albums
1972 albums
Aquarius Records (Canada) albums